Emiliano Bogado (born 18 November 1997) is an Argentine professional footballer who plays as a forward for Atlético Paraná.

Career
Bogado began in the system of Vélez Sarsfield. He first made the senior squad in July 2015 when he was an unused substitute on two occasions versus Rosario Central and Olimpo respectively. He eventually made his professional debut on 20 November 2017 during an away defeat against Huracán. That was one of two Primera División matches Bogado featured in during 2017–18. A loan move to Primera B Nacional's Santamarina was confirmed in June 2018. He returned in June 2019 after twenty-three games, with Gabriel Heinze subsequently stating Bogado was the only returning loanee to be reintegrated for pre-season.

In July 2020, having not featured at senior level for over a year, Bogado departed to join Alvarado on a free transfer.

In March 2022, Bogado moved to Torneo Federal A club Atlético Paraná.

Career statistics
.

References

External links

1997 births
Living people
People from Ushuaia
Argentine footballers
Association football forwards
Argentine Primera División players
Primera Nacional players
Torneo Federal A players
Club Atlético Vélez Sarsfield footballers
Club y Biblioteca Ramón Santamarina footballers
Club Atlético Alvarado players
Club Atlético Paraná players